Ugo Spirito (September 9, 1896, Arezzo – April 28, 1979, Rome) was an Italian philosopher; at first, a fascist political philosopher and subsequently an idealist thinker. He has also been an academic and a university teacher.

Early life
Spirito undertook academic study in law and philosophy. He was initially an advocate of positivism although in 1918, whilst attending Sapienza University of Rome, he abandoned his position to become a follower of the Actual Idealism of Giovanni Gentile. By the age of 22 he was a self-proclaimed fascist and actualist.

Fascism
Spirito's particular interest in fascism was corporatism and he came to discuss the subject in depth through the journal Nuovi Studi di Diritto, Economica e Politica. He wrote extensively on his favoured topic of 'integral corporatism', a system where ownership would be concentrated in the hands of workers rather than shareholders. This belief in integral corporatism was sometimes equated with a commitment to common ownership. Effectively therefore he represented the left-wing of fascism by supporting corporatism as a means of mass nationalisation and was the butt of criticism from other fascists who accused him of Bolshevism. Spirito's economically left-wing ideals did not come to fruition in Fascist Italy and in the later years of fascism Spirito fell out of favour with Benito Mussolini. Indeed, in 1942 he even attempted to publish a book of his theories, entitled Revolutionary War, but permission was denied by Mussolini.

Academic career
Outside of his involvement in fascist politics, Spirito held professorships at the University of Pisa, University of Messina, University of Genoa, and at Rome itself. Initially, his academic attention was taken up with economics and criminal law, but, later in his career, he became more interested in philosophical questions. In terms of publications, he served as editor of the Giornale Critico della Filosofia Italiana and the Enciclopedia Italiana, and as joint director of the Nuovi Studi di Diritto, Economica e Politica.

References

Further reading
Italian
 Cammarana, Antonio, Proposizioni sulla filosofia di Giovanni Gentile, prefazione del Sen. Armando Plebe, Roma, Gruppo parlamentare MSI-DN, Senato della Repubblica, 1975, 157 Pagine, Biblioteca Nazionale Centrale di Firenze BN 758951.
 Cammarana, Antonio, Teorica della reazione dialettica : filosofia del postcomunismo, Roma, Gruppo parlamentare MSI-DN, Senato della Repubblica, 1976, 109 Pagine, Biblioteca Nazionale Centrale di Firenze BN 775492.

External links
 

1896 births
1979 deaths
People from Arezzo
Idealists
Italian fascists
Sapienza University of Rome alumni
Academic staff of the University of Pisa
Academic staff of the Sapienza University of Rome
20th-century Italian philosophers
Academic staff of the University of Messina